Charles IV (14 May 1316 – 29 November 1378), also known as Charles of Luxembourg, born Wenceslaus, was the first King of Bohemia to become Holy Roman Emperor. He was a member of the House of Luxembourg from his father's side and the Bohemian House of Přemyslid from his mother's side; he emphasized the latter due to his lifelong affinity for the Bohemian side of his inheritance, and also because his direct ancestors in the Přemyslid line included two saints.

He was the eldest son and heir of John of Bohemia, King of Bohemia and Count of Luxembourg, who died at the Battle of Crécy on 26 August 1346. His mother, Elizabeth, Queen of Bohemia, was the sister of Wenceslaus III, King of Bohemia and Poland, the last of the male Přemyslid rulers of Bohemia. Charles inherited the County of Luxembourg from his father and was elected king of the Kingdom of Bohemia. On 2 September 1347, Charles was crowned King of Bohemia.

On 11 July 1346, the prince-electors chose him as King of the Romans (rex Romanorum) in opposition to Louis IV, Holy Roman Emperor. Charles was crowned on 26 November 1346 in Bonn. After his opponent died, he was re-elected in 1349 and crowned King of the Romans. In 1355, he was crowned King of Italy and Holy Roman Emperor. With his coronation as King of Burgundy in 1365, he became the personal ruler of all the kingdoms of the Holy Roman Empire.

Having played a tremendous part in the political and cultural history of the Kingdom of Bohemia, he remains a very popular figure in the Czech Republic. The Golden Bull of 1356 marked a structural change in the politics of the Holy Roman Empire. Several aspects of his legacy remain a contentious matter though. The image of Charles as a wise, pious, peace-loving king (partly constructed by Charles himself) has proved influential until this day, supported by several artistic or scholarly projects produced during Charles's reign or afterwards.

Life

Birth and childhood 

Charles was born to John of Bohemia of the Luxembourg dynasty and Queen Elizabeth of Bohemia of the Bohemian Přemyslid dynasty in Prague. His maternal grandfather was the Bohemian King Wenceslaus II. He chose the name Charles at his confirmation in honor of his uncle, King Charles IV of France, at whose court he was resident for seven years.

Charles received French education and was literate and fluent in five languages: Latin, Czech, German, French, and Italian.

Italy and Moravia 

In 1331, he gained some experience of warfare in Italy with his father. At the beginning of 1333, Charles went to Lucca (Tuscany) to consolidate his rule there. In an effort to defend the city, Charles founded the nearby fortress and the town of Montecarlo (Charles' Mountain).

From 1333, he administered the lands of the Bohemian Crown due to his father's frequent absence and deteriorating eyesight. In 1334, Charles was named Margrave of Moravia, the traditional title for heirs to the throne. Two years later, he assumed the government of Tyrol on behalf of his brother, John Henry, and was soon actively involved in a struggle for the possession of this county.

King of the Romans 

On 11 July 1346, in consequence of an alliance between his father and Pope Clement VI, relentless enemy of the emperor Louis IV, Charles was elected as Roman king in opposition to Louis by some of the prince-electors at Rhens. As he had previously promised to be subservient to Clement, he made extensive concessions to the pope in 1347. Confirming the papacy in the possession of vast territories, he promised to annul the acts of Louis against Clement, to take no part in Italian affairs, and to defend and protect the church.

Charles IV was in a very weak position in Germany. Owing to the terms of his election, he was derisively referred to as a "Priests' King" (Pfaffenkönig). Many bishops and nearly all of the Imperial cities remained loyal to Louis the Bavarian. Worse still, Charles backed the wrong side in the Hundred Years' War, losing his father and many of his best knights at the Battle of Crécy in August 1346, with Charles himself escaping from the field wounded.

Civil war in Germany was prevented, however, when Louis IV died on 11 October 1347, after suffering a stroke during a bear hunt. In January 1349, House of Wittelsbach partisans attempted to secure the election of Günther von Schwarzburg as king, but he attracted few supporters and was defeated by Charles at the siege of Eltville in May. Thereafter, Charles faced no direct threat to his claim to the Imperial throne.

Charles initially worked to secure his power base. Bohemia had remained untouched by the plague. Prague became his capital, and he rebuilt the city on the model of Paris, establishing the New Town (Nové Město). In 1348, he founded the Charles University in Prague, which was later named after him and was the first university in Central Europe. This served as a training ground for bureaucrats and lawyers. Soon Prague emerged as the intellectual and cultural center of Central Europe.

Having made good use of the difficulties of his opponents, Charles was again elected in Frankfurt on 17 June 1349 and re-crowned at Aachen on 25 July 1349. He was soon the undisputed ruler of the Empire. Gifts or promises had won the support of the Rhenish and Swabian towns; a marriage alliance secured the friendship of the Habsburgs; and an alliance with Rudolf II of Bavaria, Count Palatine of the Rhine, was obtained when Charles, who had become a widower in 1348, married Rudolph's daughter Anna.

In 1350, the king was visited at Prague by the Roman tribune Cola di Rienzo, who urged him to go to Italy, where the poet Petrarch and the citizens of Florence also implored his presence. Turning a deaf ear to these entreaties, Charles kept Cola in prison for a year, and then handed him as a prisoner to Clement at Avignon.

Outside Prague, Charles attempted to expand the Bohemian crown lands, using his imperial authority to acquire fiefs in Silesia, the Upper Palatinate, and Franconia. The latter regions comprised "New Bohemia", a string of possessions intended to link Bohemia with the Luxemburg territories in the Rhineland. The Bohemian estates, however, were not willing to support Charles in these ventures. When Charles sought to codify Bohemian law in the Maiestas Carolina of 1355, he met with sharp resistance. After that point, Charles found it expedient to scale back his efforts at centralization.

Holy Roman Emperor 

In 1354, Charles crossed the Alps without an army, received the Lombard crown in St. Ambrose Basilica, Milan, on 6 January 1355, and was crowned emperor at Rome by a cardinal on April 5th of the same year. His sole object appears to have been to obtain the Imperial crown in peace, in accordance with a promise previously made to Pope Clement. He only remained in the city for a few hours, in spite of the expressed wishes of the Roman people. Having virtually abandoned all the Imperial rights in Italy, the emperor re-crossed the Alps, pursued by the scornful words of Petrarch, but laden with considerable wealth. On his return, Charles was occupied with the administration of the Empire, then just recovering from the Black Death, and in 1356, he promulgated the famous Golden Bull to regulate the election of the king.

Having given Moravia to one brother, John Henry, and erected the county of Luxembourg into a duchy for another, Wenceslaus, he was unremitting in his efforts to secure other territories as compensation and to strengthen the Bohemian monarchy. To this end he purchased part of the upper Palatinate of the Rhine in 1353, and in 1367 annexed Lower Lusatia to Bohemia and bought numerous estates in various parts of Germany. On the death of Meinhard, Duke of Upper Bavaria and Count of Tyrol, in 1363, Upper Bavaria was claimed by the sons of the emperor Louis IV, and Tyrol by Rudolf IV, Duke of Austria. Both claims were admitted by Charles on the understanding that if these families died out both territories should pass to the House of Luxembourg. At about the same time, he was promised the succession to the Margravate of Brandenburg, which he actually obtained for his son Wenceslaus in 1373.

Casimir III of Poland and Louis I of Hungary entered a conspiracy against Charles and managed to persuade Otto V of Bavaria to join. After the repeal of the estate contract by margrave Otto, in early July 1371, Charles IV declared hostilities and invaded Margraviate of Brandenburg; after two years of conflict, in 1373 Brandenburg became part of the Czech lands. This was when he gave the order to measure his new territory, its villages, people, and income. This was recorded in the Landbuch of Charles IV, which was finished in 1375. Many villages were mentioned for the first time in this book, so it can provide information on how old they are. He also gained a considerable portion of Silesian territory, partly by inheritance through his third wife, Anna von Schweidnitz, daughter of Henry II, Duke of Świdnica and Catherine of Hungary. In 1365, Charles visited Pope Urban V at Avignon and undertook to escort him to Rome; on the same occasion he was crowned King of Burgundy at Arles.

His second journey to Italy took place in 1368 when he had a meeting with Pope Urban V at Viterbo, was besieged in his palace at Siena, and left the country before the end of 1369. During his later years, the emperor took little part in German affairs beyond securing the election of his son Wenceslaus as king of the Romans in 1376, and negotiating a peace between the Swabian League of Cities and some nobles in 1378. After dividing his lands between his three sons and his nephews, he died in November 1378 at Prague, where he was buried, and where a statue was erected to his memory in 1848.

Charles IV suffered from gout (metabolic arthritis), a painful disease quite common in that time.

Legacy

Evaluation 

The reign of Charles IV was characterized by a transformation in the nature of the Empire and is remembered as the Golden Age of Bohemia. He promulgated the Golden Bull of 1356 whereby the succession to the imperial title was laid down, which held for the next four centuries.

He also organized the states of the empire into peace-keeping confederations. In these, the Imperial cities figured prominently. The Swabian Landfriede confederation of 1370 was made up almost entirely of Imperial Cities. At the same time, the leagues were organized and led by the crown and its agents. As with the electors, the cities that served in these leagues were given privileges to aid in their efforts to keep the peace.

He assured his dominance over the eastern borders of the Empire through succession treaties with the Habsburgs and the purchase of Brandenburg. He also claimed imperial lordship over the crusader states of Prussia and Livonia.

In 2005 Charles IV ranked the first in the TV show Největší Čech, the Czech spin-off of the BBC Greatest Britons show.

Patronage of culture and the arts 

Prague became the capital of the Holy Roman Empire during the reign of Charles IV. The name of the royal founder and patron remains on many monuments and institutions, for example Charles University, Charles Bridge, Charles Square. High Gothic Prague Castle and part of the cathedral of Saint Vitus by Peter Parler were also built under his patronage.  Finally, the first flowering of manuscript painting in Prague dates from Charles's reign. In the present Czech Republic, he is still regarded as Pater Patriae (father of the country or otec vlasti), a title first coined by Adalbertus Ranconis de Ericinio at his funeral.

Charles also had strong ties to Nuremberg, staying within its city walls 52 times and thereby strengthening its reputation amongst German cities.  Charles was the patron of the Nuremberg Frauenkirche, built between 1352 and 1362 (the architect was likely Peter Parler), where the imperial court worshipped during its stays in Nuremberg.

Charles's imperial policy was focused on the dynastic sphere and abandoned the lofty ideal of the Empire as a universal monarchy of Christendom. In 1353, he granted the Duchy of Luxembourg to his half-brother, Wenceslaus. He concentrated his energies chiefly on the economic and intellectual development of Bohemia, where he founded the university in 1348 and encouraged the early humanists. He corresponded with Petrarch and invited him to visit the royal residence in Prague, whilst the Italian hoped – to no avail – to see Charles move his residence to Rome and reawaken tradition of the Roman Empire.

Charles's sister Bona married the eldest son of Philip VI of France, the future John II of France, in 1335. Thus, Charles was the maternal uncle of Charles V of France, who solicited his relative's advice at Metz in 1356 during the Parisian Revolt. This family connection was celebrated publicly when Charles made a solemn visit to his nephew in 1378, just months before his death. A detailed account of the occasion, enriched by many splendid miniatures, can be found in Charles V's copy of the Grandes Chroniques de France.

Castles 

Castles built or established by Charles IV:

 Karlštejn, 1348–1355 in Central Bohemian Region for safekeeping the Imperial Regalia, especially the Imperial Crown of the Holy Roman Empire (later the Czech Crown Jewels were also kept there)
 Kašperk (Karlsberg), 1356 in Kašperské Hory in Plzeň Region
 Lauf (Wenzelsburg) – built on the way connecting Prague and Nuremberg in Bohemian Palatinate, inside survived 112 coats of arms of the Bohemian Kingdom
 Montecarlo in Italy
 Radyně (Karlskrone) – around 1360 in Plzeň Region
 Hrádek u Purkarce (Karlshaus) – around 1357
 Tepenec (Twingenberg, Karlsburg) in Jívová in Olomouc Region
 Karlsfried

Places named after Charles IV 

 Czech Republic
 Karlovy Vary, a spa city
 Karlštejn, a town beyond the eponymous castle
 Charles Bridge (Karlův most), Prague
 Charles University (Univerzita Karlova), Prague
 Multiple squares – Charles Square (Karlovo náměstí) in Prague and others, for example in Brno, Kolín, Mělník etc.
 Multiple streets

 Italy
 Montecarlo (Charles's Mountain), a municipality

Other 

 The 100-Czech koruna banknote
 16951 Carolus Quartus, an asteroid

Family

Genealogy

Marriages and children 

Charles was married four times.  His first wife was Blanche of Valois (1316–1348), daughter of Charles, Count of Valois, and a half-sister of King Philip VI of France. They had three children:

 son (b. 1334), died young
 Margaret of Bohemia, Queen of Hungary (1335–1349); married King Louis I of Hungary.
 Catherine of Bohemia (1342–1395); married Rudolf IV, Duke of Austria and Otto V, Duke of Bavaria and Elector of Brandenburg.

He secondly married Anna of Bavaria, (1329–1353), daughter of Rudolf II, Count Palatine of the Rhine; they had one son:

 Wenceslaus (1350–1351).

His third wife was Anna von Schweidnitz, (1339–1362), daughter of Henry II, Duke of Świdnica and Katharina of Anjou (daughter of Charles I Robert, King of Hungary), by whom he had three children:

 Elisabeth of Bohemia (19 April 1358 – 4 September 1373); married Albert III, Duke of Austria at the very young age of 8 and died at the age of 15, they had no children.
 Wenceslaus IV of Bohemia (1361–1419); later elected King of Germany (formally King of the Romans) and on his father's death, became King of Bohemia (as Wenceslaus IV) and Emperor-elect of the Holy Roman Empire; married firstly to Joanna of Bavaria in 1370 and secondly to Sophia of Bavaria in 1389.
 son (born and died 11 July 1362).

His fourth wife was Elizabeth of Pomerania, (1345 or 1347 – 1393), daughter of Bogislaw V, Duke of Pomerania and Elisabeth of Poland who was the daughter of King Casimir III of Poland. They had six children:

 Anne of Bohemia, Queen of England (1366–1394); married King Richard II of England
 Sigismund of Bohemia (1368–1437); later  became Holy Roman Emperor, was King of Bohemia, Margrave of Brandenburg, and also King of Hungary through his first marriage to Mary, Queen of Hungary in 1385. His second marriage was to Barbara of Cilli, the daughter and youngest child of Herman II, Count of Celje, in 1405/1408.
 John of Bohemia (1370–1396); later Margrave of Moravia and Duke of Görlitz; married Richardis Catherine of Sweden, the daughter of Albert, King of Sweden. His only daughter and heiress Elisabeth of Görlitz was Duchess of Luxembourg.
 Charles (13 March 1372 – 24 July 1373).
 Margaret of Bohemia, Burgravine of Nuremberg (1373–1410); married John III, Burgrave of Nuremberg.
 Henry (1377–1378)

Charles had one illegitimate son, William, born in 1362 to an unknown woman. He was raised in Brabant and seems to have joined his father at the time of the latter's trip to France in 1377. He was acknowledged by his father, who sought a papal dispensation for him to marry within the fourth degree. It is unknown if he ever married. He served his Bohemian relatives as a diplomat, but his ultimate fate is unknown.

References

Bibliography

Further reading 

 Charles IV (autobiography), edited by Balázs Nagy, Frank Schaer: Autobiography of Emperor Charles IV; And, His Legend of St. Wenceslas: Karoli IV Imperatoris Romanorum Vita Ab Eo Ipso Conscripta; Et, Hystoria Nova de Sancto Wenceslao Martyre, Published by Central European University Press, 2001, 259 pages, books.google.com

External links 

 
 
 Entry in the Residenzen-Kommission
 Regesta Imperii
 Publications on Charles IV. in the OPAC of the Regesta Imperii
 'Constitutiones et acta publica imperatorum et regum 1357–1378' – digital pre-publication of documents by Charles IV by the MGH
 
 Aleksandra Filipek-Misiak, Karol IV Luksemburski jako ideał władcy w Catalogus abbatum Saganensium Ludolfa z Żagania, In: Historie – Otázky – Problémy, 7 (2015), z. 1, pp. 76–89
 Lewis E 64 Golden Bull of Charles IV at OPenn

 
1316 births
1378 deaths
14th-century Holy Roman Emperors
Anti-kings
Medieval kings of Bohemia
14th-century Bohemian people
House of Luxembourg
Counts of Luxembourg
Prince-electors of Brandenburg
Czech people of Luxembourgian descent
Czech expatriates in France
Czech people of French descent
Nobility from Prague
Burials at St. Vitus Cathedral
14th-century Luxembourgian people
Czech Roman Catholics